The 2012-13 FFHG Division 1 season was contested by 14 teams, and saw the Albatros de Brest win the championship. They were promoted to the Ligue Magnus as result. The Bélougas de Toulouse-Blagnac and the Galaxians d’Amnéville were relegated to FFHG Division 2.

Regular season

Playoffs

External links
 Season on hockeyarchives.info

2
FFHG Division 1 seasons
Fra